Shāhin-i Shirāzi  (born in Shiraz in the Ilkhanate, now in Iran) was a Persian Jewish poet in the 14th century.

Biography
The details surrounding his biography are not clear. It is known that he worked during the reign of Ilkhan Abu Sa'id Bahadur Khan (1316-1335), and that he was also a contemporary of the Persian poet Hafez (d. 1390), who was also from Shiraz. It is unclear whether '"Shahin" is the poet's first name or his pen name. It is possible that he was from Kashan and that he was buried in Shiraz.

Works
His works include epic cycles (poetic epics) from the Torah and from later parts of the Hebrew Bible. The Musā-nāmah was composed in 1327, and includes narratives from the books of Exodus, Leviticus, Numbers, Deuteronomy. The work contains close to 10,000 couplets. His versification of the Book of Genesis, the Bereshit-nāmah, was composed around 1358 and contains close to 8700 couplets. 

His epic poem on the tale of Esther, Ardashir-nāmah, includes multiple stories in addition to the well-known biblical narrative. For example, Shāhin also expounds on the adventures of Shiru, the son of Ardashir (Ahaseurus) and Queen Vashti.

 
 
 Ardashir-nāmah (The book of Ardashir)
 Ezra-nāmah (The Book of Ezra)

See also

List of Persian-language poets and authors
Persian literature
Persian Jews
Judeo-Persian
7dorim.com (Persian)

Further reading

 Amnon Netzer: "Literature of the Jews of Iran, A short survey." Padyavand Vol 1. Los Angeles 1996, pp 5–17.
 David Gilinsky, "An original critical edition with English translation of Chapter 26 of Ardashir Nameh", BA Finals Dissertation, Cambridge University, April 1992, available from Cambridge University Library and on SCRIBD.
 E.G. Browne. Literary History of Persia. (Four volumes, 2,256 pages, and twenty-five years in the writing). 1998. 
 Jan Rypka, History of Iranian Literature. Reidel Publishing Company.
 Vera Basch Moreen (tr. and ed.), In Queen Esther's Garden: An Anthology of Judeo-Persian Literature (Yale Judaica): Yale 2000,

References

People from Shiraz
14th-century Persian-language poets
Medieval Persian Jews
14th-century Jews
Year of death unknown
Year of birth unknown
Ilkhanate-period poets